Spondin 2, also known as mindin, is a protein that in humans is encoded by the SPON2 gene.

References

Further reading 

 
 
 
 
 
 
 
 
 

Extracellular matrix proteins